Ingenuity, nicknamed Ginny, is a small robotic helicopter operating on Mars. It is part of NASA's Mars 2020 mission, along with the Perseverance rover, which landed with Ingenuity attached to its underside on February 18, 2021. The helicopter was deployed to the surface on April 3, 2021. On April 19, it successfully made the first powered controlled extraterrestrial flight by an aircraft, taking off vertically, hovering, and landing for a flight duration of 39.1 seconds. As of its 47th flight on March 9, 2023, the helicopter has been flightworthy for  days.

Ingenuity was designed by NASA's Jet Propulsion Laboratory (JPL) in collaboration with AeroVironment, NASA's Ames Research Center and Langley Research Center. Other prominent contributors were Lockheed Martin Space, Qualcomm, and SolAero. Its rectangular fuselage measures , with four landing legs of  each. It is operated by solar-charged batteries that power dual counter-rotating rotors mounted coaxially one above the other.

The helicopter was intended to perform a 30-day technology demonstration, making five flights at altitudes ranging  for up to 90 seconds each. The expected lateral range was exceeded in the third flight, and the flight duration was exceeded in the fourth. The flights demonstrated the helicopter's ability to fly in the extremely thin atmosphere of Mars, over a hundred million miles from Earth, without direct human control. Because radio signals take 5 to 20 minutes to travel between Earth and Mars depending on planetary positions, Ingenuity must operate autonomously, performing maneuvers planned, scripted and transmitted to it by JPL.

After the brief demonstration phase, JPL began more operational flights, showing how aerial scouting could aid in the exploration of Mars and other worlds. In its operational role, Ingenuity is observing areas of interest for possible examination by Perseverance. The helicopter's performance and resilience greatly exceeded expectations, enabling it to make flights for the remainder of 2021 and into 2022. In March 2022, NASA announced that it would continue to fly Ingenuity through at least September.

Flight success was confirmed three hours later by JPL, which livestreamed a view of mission control receiving the data. On its fourth flight, on April 30, 2021, Ingenuity became the first interplanetary spacecraft whose sound was recorded by another interplanetary spacecraft, Perseverance.

Ingenuity carries a piece of fabric from the wing of the 1903 Wright Flyer, the Wright Brothers' airplane used in the first controlled powered heavier-than-air flight on Earth. Ingenuity's initial take-off and landing area is named Wright Brothers Field as a tribute. Before Ingenuity, the first flight of any kind on a planet beyond Earth was an unpowered balloon flight on Venus by the Soviet Vega 1 spacecraft in 1985.

Design 

The lower gravity of Mars (about a third of Earth's) only partially offsets the thinness of the 95% carbon dioxide atmosphere of Mars, making it much harder for an aircraft to generate adequate lift. This density reduces even more in Martian winters. To keep Ingenuity aloft, its specially shaped blades of enlarged size must rotate between 2400 and 2900 rpm, or about 10 times faster than what is needed on Earth.

Ingenuity has two cameras: a downward-looking black-and-white navigation camera (NAV), and a color camera, for terrain images for return to Earth (RTE). Although it is an aircraft, it was constructed to spacecraft specifications to endure the acceleration and vibrations during launch. It also includes radiation-resistant systems capable of operating in Mars's environment. Mars's magnetic field precludes the use of a compass for navigation, so Ingenuity relies on different sensors grouped in two assemblies. All sensors are commercial off-the-shelf units.

The Upper Sensor Assembly, with associated vibration isolation elements, is mounted on the mast close to the vehicle's center-of-mass to minimize the effects of angular rates and accelerations. It consists of a cellphone-grade Bosch BMI-160 Inertial measurement unit (IMU); and an inclinometer (Murata SCA100T-D02), which is used only on the ground prior to flight to calibrate the IMU accelerometers biases. The Lower Sensor Assembly consists of an altimeter (Garmin LIDAR Lite v3), both cameras, and a secondary IMU, all mounted directly on the Electronics Core Module (not on the mast). The down-facing Omnivision OV7251 camera supports visual odometry, where images are processed to produce navigation solutions that calculate the helicopter's position, velocity, attitude, and other variables.

Flight duration is not constrained by the available power, but by the motors heating up 1 °C every second.
The helicopter uses a Qualcomm Snapdragon 801 processor with a Linux operating system. Among other functions, it controls the visual navigation algorithm via a velocity estimate derived from terrain features tracked with the navigation camera. The Qualcomm processor is connected to two flight-control microcontroller units (MCUs) to perform necessary flight-control functions.

The telecommunication system consists of two identical radios with monopole antennae for data exchange between the helicopter and rover. The radio link utilizes the low-power Zigbee communication protocols, implemented via 914 MHz SiFlex 02 chipsets mounted in both vehicles. The antenna on the helicopter's solar panel weighs 4 grams and can communicate equally in all directions.

Conceptual design 

NASA's JPL and AeroVironment published the conceptual design in 2014 for a scout helicopter to accompany a rover. By mid-2016, $15 million was being requested to continue development of the helicopter. By December 2017, engineering models of the vehicle had been tested in a simulated martian atmosphere and models were undergoing testing in the Arctic, but its inclusion in the mission had not yet been approved or funded. The United States federal budget, announced in March 2018, provided $23 million for the helicopter for one year, and it was announced on May 11, 2018, that the helicopter could be developed and tested in time to be included in the Mars 2020 mission. The helicopter underwent extensive flight-dynamics and environment testing, and was mounted on the underside of the Perseverance rover in August 2019. NASA spent about $80 million to build Ingenuity and about $5 million to operate the helicopter.

In April 2020, the vehicle was named Ingenuity by Vaneeza Rupani, a girl in the 11th grade at Tuscaloosa County High School in Northport, Alabama, who submitted an essay into NASA's "Name the Rover" contest. Known in planning stages as the Mars Helicopter Scout, or simply the Mars Helicopter, the nickname Ginny later entered use in parallel to the parent rover Perseverance being affectionately referred to as Percy. Its full-scale engineering model for testing on Earth - Earth Copter and unofficially Terry.

Ingenuity was designed to be a technology demonstrator by JPL to assess whether such a vehicle could fly safely. Before it was built, launched and landed, scientists and managers expressed hope that helicopters could provide better mapping and guidance that would give future mission controllers more information to help with travel routes, planning and hazard avoidance. Based on the performance of previous rovers through Curiosity, it was assumed that such aerial scouting might enable future rovers to safely drive up to three times as far per sol. However, the new AutoNav capability of Perseverance significantly reduced this advantage, allowing the rover to cover more than 100 meters per sol.

Preliminary tests on Earth 
In 2019, preliminary designs of Ingenuity were tested on Earth in simulated Mars atmospheric and gravity conditions. For flight testing, a large vacuum chamber was used to simulate the very low pressure of the atmosphere of Mars – filled with carbon dioxide to approximately 0.60% (about ) of standard atmospheric pressure at sea level on Earth – which is roughly equivalent to a helicopter flying at  altitude in the atmosphere of Earth. In order to simulate the much reduced gravity field of Mars (38% of Earth's), 62% of Earth's gravity was offset by a line pulling upwards during flight tests. A "wind-wall" consisting of almost 900 computer fans was used to provide wind in the chamber.

Funding
At the time of the approval of the Mars 2020 program in July 2014, a helicopter flight demonstration was neither scoped nor budgeted. It was not until May 11, 2018, that Ingenuity was approved to be included in the mission. At the time of launch, the cost for designing and building this additional mission element was US$85 million.

Just prior to the final demonstration flight, on April 30, 2021, NASA allocated funding to continue the operation of Ingenuity for an “operational demonstration phase” to explore using a helicopter as supplementary reconnaissance for ground assets like Perseverance. Funding for Ingenuity is regularly renewed on a monthly basis.

Mission profile
The Ingenuity helicopter was expected to fly up to five times during a 30-day test campaign, early in the rover's mission.

The first flight succeeded, and subsequent flights were increasingly ambitious as allotted time for operating the helicopter dwindled. JPL said the mission might even stop before the 30-day period ended, in the likely event that the helicopter crashed, an outcome which did not occur. In up to 90 seconds per flight, Ingenuity could travel as far as  downrange and then back to the starting area, though that goal was also soon exceeded with the fourth flight. The helicopter uses autonomous control during its flights, which are telerobotically planned and scripted by operators at Jet Propulsion Laboratory (JPL). It communicates with the Perseverance rover directly before and after each landing.

After the successful first three flights, the objective was changed from technology demonstration to operational demonstration. Ingenuity flew through a transitional phase of two flights, flight 4 and 5 before transitioning to its operations demonstration phase. In the operations demonstration phase that started from the 6th flight, the mission goal shifted towards supporting the rover science mission by mapping and scouting the terrain. While Ingenuity would do more to help Perseverance, the rover would pay less attention to the helicopter and stop taking pictures of it in flight. JPL managers said the photo procedure took an "enormous" amount of time, slowing the project's main mission of looking for signs of ancient life. On 30 April 2021, the fourth flight successfully captured numerous color photos and explored the surface with its black-and-white navigation camera. On May 7, Ingenuity successfully flew to a new landing site.

In September 2021 after 12 flights, the mission was extended indefinitely. In March 2022 after 21 flights, NASA said it would continue flying Ingenuity until at least the coming September. The area of the helicopter's next goal is more rugged than the relatively flat terrain it flew over in its first year of operation. The ancient fan-shaped river delta has jagged cliffs, angled surfaces and projecting boulders. Ingenuity will help the mission team decide which route Perseverance should take to the top of the delta and may aid in analyzing potential science targets. Software updates will eliminate the helicopter's 50-foot altitude limit, allow it to change speed in flight, and improve its understanding of terrain texture below it. NASA associate administrator Thomas Zurbuchen said less than a year earlier "we didn't even know if powered, controlled flight of an aircraft at Mars was possible." He said the transformation in understanding what the aircraft can do is "one of the most historic in the annals of air and space exploration."

Cameras and photography

[[File:PIA23969-Ingenuity Helicopter Imaging Suite.jpg|thumb|Ingenuity'''s two cameras]]Ingenuity has two commercial-off-the-shelf (COTS) cameras. The Sony IMX 214 with 4208 x 3120 pixel resolution is a color camera with a rolling shutter to make terrain images for return to Earth (RTE). The Omnivision OV7251 (640 × 480) VGA is the downward-looking black and white global shutter navigation camera (NAV), which supplies the onboard computer of the helicopter with the raw data essential for flight control.

While the RTE color camera is not necessary for flight and may be switched off (as in flights 7 and 8), the NAV camera works throughout each flight, catching the first frame before takeoff and the last frame after landing. Its frame rate is synchronized with blade rotation to ease online image processing.

During flight, all NAV frames must be carefully stored in the onboard helicopter computer, with each frame assigned the unique timestamp of its creation. Loss of a single NAV image timestamp was an anomaly that caused the helicopter to move erratically during flight 6.

The longer a flight lasts, the more NAV photos must be stored. Each new record flight duration automatically means a record number of images taken by the NAV camera. The frequency and timing of the camera's operations are predetermined not for the sake of records, but due to the technical necessity. A huge number of NAV files does not overload the local storage of the helicopter. Less than 200 NAV files are uploaded to NASA storage after each flight (starting with the eighth flight), and the total volume is only about five megabytes. The limitations are imposed by weakness of local telecommunications: when landed, the helicopter relays data to the rover in a slow mode of 20 kbit/s. Another significant limitation is caused by the location of the antenna on the side of the rover. If turned wrong side to the helicopter, the rover body may impede signal reception.

The navigation camera has been programmed to deactivate whenever the rotorcraft is within  of the surface. This helps ensure any dust kicked up during takeoff and landing won't interfere with the navigation system as it tracks features on the ground.

Most of the NAV files are not transmitted to the rover base station for return to Earth. JPL explained that navigation images are used by Ingenuity's flight computer and then discarded unless controllers tell the helicopter to store them for later use. Ingenuity captures navigation images at 30 frames per second and saves one image approximately every 700 milliseconds to be transmitted later to Earth and released to the public. From more than 4000 NAV files acquired on flight four, only 62 were stored.

[[File:Combination of two images, one each from Ingenuity's Navigation Camera and colour camera (RTE).jpg|thumb|Combination of two images, one each from Ingenuitys Navigation Camera and colour camera (RTE), taken while Ingenuity was on the ground.]]
With the end of the flight technology demonstration, Perseverance project manager Jennifer Trosper relinquished her team's responsibilities for photographing Ingenuity to concentrate exclusively on the rover science mission of searching for signs of ancient Martian life. Without pictures from the rover, the flight team relied more heavily on photos taken by the helicopter NAV camera to confirm Ingenuity's location. The helicopter, however, does not create or refine the maps, but rather, depends upon work coordinated by the U.S. Geological Survey's Astrogeology Science Center and performed by the NASA Mars and Lunar Cartography Working Groups.

To support the Mars-2020 mission, USGS used photos by the High-Resolution Imaging Science Experiment (HiRISE) on the Mars Reconnaissance Orbiter (MRO) to produce Context Camera (CTX) and Digital Terrain Models (DTM) and orthoimage mosaics. Those images were used by the Terrain Relative Navigation (TRN) feature on the Perseverance descent vehicle and helped determine the safest landing location. Using maps created from photos and radar elevation data previously acquired by the MRO and other NASA missions, planetary cartographers manually correlate them with terrain features seen by Ingenuity's small and lens-distorted NAV images. After each NAV frame is assigned a georeference, the resulting flight maps are shown at NASA's Mars-2020 tracking service. NAV frames from Ingenuity are also used to produce moving images that show the Martian terrain passing under Ingenuity during its flights.

In November 2021 the Ingenuity team started to supply scientists a new kind of photographic materials — color photos taken on the ground during the inter-flight periods. By December, scientists had received two such photos, the first one acquired on November 15 (sol 263) and another on November 27 (sol 274).

Unlike Perseverance, Ingenuity does not have a special stereo camera for taking twin photos for 3D pictures simultaneously. However, the helicopter has made such images by taking duplicate color photos of the same terrain while hovering in slightly offset positions, as in flight 11, or by taking an offset picture on the return leg of a roundtrip flight, as in flight 12.

As of December 16, 2021, 2091 black-and-white images from the navigation camera and 104 color images from the terrain camera (RTE) have been published.

Enhancing capability of cameras

Before flight 34, the operations team has been at work installing a 4th major software update aboard the helicopter. This update provides Ingenuity two major new capabilities: hazard avoidance when landing and the use of digital elevation maps to help navigate.

Ingenuity was developed as a technology demonstration and designed to operate on Mars in flat, smooth terrain like that at Wright Brothers Field. As Ingenuity moved on to exploring Jezero Crater alongside the Perseverance rover, it traveled through more challenging terrain than the team had ever anticipated.

In prior flights, Ingenuitys pilots have needed to find airfields free of any rocks or other obstacles that could potentially damage the vehicle when landing. Jezero Crater is rocky, meaning safe airfields have been tough to find. Using Ingenuitys downward-facing navigation camera, this software update adds hazard avoidance on landing to work like Hazard Avoidance Cameras on the rover. While in flight, Ingenuity will identify the safest visible landing site. When preparing to land, Ingenuity will then divert over to this selected site. This capability allows Ingenuity to safely land in rockier terrain than before, providing pilots with many more potential landing sites.

Ingenuitys navigation software was designed to assume the vehicle was flying over flat terrain. When the helicopter is flying over terrain like hills, this flat-ground assumption causes Ingenuity’s navigation software to think the vehicle is veering, causing it to start actually veering in an attempt to counter the error. Over long flights, navigation errors caused by rough terrain must be accounted for, requiring the team to select large airfields. This new software update corrects this flat-ground assumption by using digital elevation maps of Jezero Crater to help the navigation software distinguish between changes in terrain and vehicle movement. This increases Ingenuity’s accuracy, allowing the pilots to target smaller airfields going forward.

Operational history

Perseverance dropped the debris shield protecting Ingenuity on March 21, 2021, and the helicopter deployed from the underside of the rover to the martian surface on April 3, 2021. That day both cameras of the helicopter were tested taking their first b/w and color photos of the floor of Jezero Crater in the shadow of the rover.

Ingenuity rotor blades were successfully unlocked on April 8, 2021 (mission sol 48), and the helicopter performed a low-speed rotor spin test at 50 rpm.

A high-speed spin test was attempted on April 9, but failed due to the expiration of a watchdog timer, a software measure to protect the helicopter from incorrect operation in unforeseen conditions. On April 12, JPL said it identified a software fix to correct the problem. To save time, however, JPL decided to use a workaround procedure, which managers said had an 85% chance of succeeding and would be "the least disruptive" to the helicopter.

On April 16, 2021, Ingenuity successfully passed the full-speed 2400 rpm rotor spin test while remaining on the surface. Three days later, April 19, JPL flew the helicopter for the first time. The watchdog timer problem occurred again when the fourth flight was attempted. The team rescheduled the flight, which succeeded on April 30. On June 25, JPL said it had uploaded a software update the previous week to permanently fix the watchdog problem, and that a rotor spin test and the eighth flight confirmed that the update worked.

The Ingenuity team plans to fly the helicopter every two to three weeks during its indefinitely extended mission. The helicopter's longer-than-expected flying career lasted into a seasonal change on Mars, when the atmospheric density at its location became even lower. The flight team prepared by commanding Ingenuity to ground-test a faster rotor blade rotation, needed for sufficient lift. JPL said the higher planned flight speed of 2700 rpm would pose new risks, including vibration, power consumption and aerodynamic drag if the blade tips approach the speed of sound. The test speed was 2800 rpm, giving a margin for increase if the intended flight speed of 2700 is not enough. Ingenuity faced another challenge to remain functional during the Martian winter and solar conjunction, when Mars moves behind the Sun, blocking communications with Earth and forcing the rover and helicopter to halt operations. The shutdown happened in mid-October 2021, for which preparations started in mid-September. JPL intended to continue flying Ingenuity since it survived solar conjunction. NASA leadership has stated that extending the mission will increase the project's expenses, but that they believe the cost to be worthwhile for the information learned.

The start time of a flight is chosen depending on temperature management of the batteries, which need to warm up after the night. During Martian summer lower air density imposed a higher load on the motors, so flights were shifted from noon (LMST 12:30) to morning (LMST 9:30) and limited to 130 seconds to not overheat the motors.

On May 3 and 4, 2022, for the first time in the mission, the helicopter unexpectedly failed to communicate with the rover, following the 28th flight on April 29. JPL determined that Ingenuity'''s rechargeable batteries suffered a power drop or insufficient battery state-of-charge (SOC) while going into the night, most likely because of a seasonal increase in atmospheric dust reducing sunshine on its solar panel and due to lower temperatures as winter approached. When the battery pack's state of charge dropped below a lower limit, the helicopter's field-programmable gate array (FPGA) powered down, resetting the mission clock, which lost sync with the base station on the rover. Contact was re-established on May 5. Controllers decided to turn off the helicopter's heaters at night to conserve power, accepting the risk of exposing components to nighttime's extreme cold. This daily SOC deficit is likely to persist for the duration of Martian winter (at least until September/October). Each sol could be Ingenuity's last.

In a June 6, 2022 update, JPL reported Ingenuity's inclination sensor had stopped working. Its purpose was to determine the helicopter's orientation at the start of each flight. Mission controllers developed a workaround using the craft's inertial measurement unit (IMU) to provide equivalent data to the onboard navigation computer.

 Tributes to the Wright brothers 
NASA and JPL officials described the first Mars Ingenuity helicopter flight as their "Wright Brothers moment", by analogy to the first successful airplane flight on Earth. A small piece of the wing cloth from the Wright brothers' 1903 Wright Flyer is attached to a cable underneath Ingenuitys solar panel. In 1969, Apollo 11's Neil Armstrong carried a similar Wright Flyer artifact to the Moon in the Lunar Module Eagle.

NASA named Ingenuity first take-off and landing airstrip Wright Brothers Field, which the UN agency ICAO gave an airport code of JZRO for Jezero Crater, and the drone itself a type designator of IGY, call-sign INGENUITY.

From Demo to Machine type

Stages of creating a Martian helicopter

The history of the Mars Helicopter team dates back to 2012, when MiMi Aung was leading then JPL director Charles Elachi on a tour of the Autonomous Systems Division. Looking at the drones demonstrating onboard navigation algorithms in one of the labs, Elachi asked, "Hey, why don't we do that on Mars?" Engineer Bob Balaram briefed Elachi about feasibility, and a week later Elachi told him, "Okay, I've got some study money for you". By January 2015 NASA agreed to fund the development of a full-size model, which came to be known as the "risk reduction" vehicle. As project manager, Aung assembled a multidisciplinary team of scientists, engineers, and technicians.

The JPL team was never larger than 65 full-time-equivalent employees, but program workers at AeroVironment and NASA AMES and Langley research centers brought the total to 150. Team members include:
 MiMi Aung — Ingenuity Mars Helicopter Project Manager at NASA's Jet Propulsion Laboratory, «the Mars Helicopter Scout proposal lead»
 Bob Balaram — Chief Engineer
 Teddy Tzanetos — Operations Lead
 Håvard Fjær Grip — Chief Pilot
 Jaakko Karras — Chief Engineer (since November 2021)
 Timothy Canham - Flight Software Lead and Operations Lead (prior to June 2021)
 Josh Ravich — Mechanical Engineering Lead
 Nacer Chahat — Senior antenna/microwave engineer (designed the antennae supporting the radio link on both Ingenuity and Perseverance)

On June 15, 2021, the team behind Ingenuity was named the 2021 winner of the John L. "Jack" Swigert, Jr. Award for Space Exploration from the Space Foundation.

On April 5, 2022, the National Aeronautic Association awarded Ingenuity and its group in JPL the 2021 Collier Trophy. A reception in honor of the awardees was held in Washington on June 9.

Opposition to the helicopter

Recalling in late 2021 the ups and downs of Ingenuity history and flight, IEEE Spectrum Senior Editor Evan Ackerman joked: “Maybe Perseverance should have been the name of this little Martian helicopter?”. The helicopter team had to show perseverance even at the stage of the struggle for a place on board the spacecraft. Up until the end of the 2010s, quite a few NASA leaders, scientists and JPL employees actively put forward counterarguments against the integration of a helicopter into the next expedition. For three years, the future Ingenuity has been developed outside the Mars 2020 project and its budget. When NASA management accepted assurances in the spring of 2018 that the addition of a helicopter would not harm the goals of the expedition, the chief scientist of this project Kenneth Farley stated that it does not follow from the fact that Ingenuity was taken on board that the team supported this decision even with guarantees of no risk:
... “I am not an advocate for the helicopter, and I don't believe the Mars 2020 project has been an advocate for the helicopter,”.
Convinced that the helicopter was a distraction of a group of scientists from a priority scientific task, unacceptable even for a short time, Farley concluded:
…This comes right out of science time… I have personally been opposed to it because we are working very hard for efficiencies and spending 30 days working on a technology demonstration does not further those goals directly from the science point of view.

The skepticism on the part of NASA leadership was not unfounded. Scientists, engineers and managers proceeded from a pragmatic comparison of the benefits of additional aerial reconnaissance with the costs that inevitably fall on the schedule for the rover to complete all the tasks assigned to it. Back on April 30, arguing with MiMi Aung on the air of a joint conference, Jennifer Trosper warned that thanks to auto-navigation, the rover ultimately outpaces the helicopter. These calculations were first confirmed in the spring of 2022, when by the beginning of Sol 400 the helicopter did not take a leading position on the track along the slopes of the delta, although it covered a distance several times less than the rover. Due to the increased loss of time for recharging and transmitting telemetry, the attempt to bring the helicopter to the position of the route plotter, planned during the ascent to the delta, also failed.

At the end of the "test window", NASA extended support for Ingenuity for another 30 sols, limiting the frequency of departures to 1 flight every few weeks. Later on, some of NASA's senior leaders seized the opportunity to dampen their enthusiasm for the Martian helicopter. Thus, addressing directly all the staff of the Mars 2020 project, the director of the Mars exploration program E. Janson and the principal Mars explorer M. Meyer urged the staff to “be highly disciplined and concentrate on collecting samples”. At the same time, in their report to the Planetary Advisory Committee (PAC) on June 14, 2021, the helicopter was mentioned only in the past tense: “placed Ingenuity and completed the technology demonstration phase”.

Pushing the limits

The name operations demo (demonstration of operations), which appeared after the completion of the technology demonstration stage (technology demo), was a bureaucratic compromise that allowed to justify the funding of Ingenuity's "extra" flights after the previous stage was completed. Operations here refers to the joint work of two teams, Perseverance and Ingenuity, proving the viability of the entire concept of the research complex, in which the planetary rover is a multifunctional self-propelled "scientific combine", and the aircraft is its auxiliary operational unit. In practice, already from the 6th flight, the work went beyond the demonstration of the interaction of vehicles. Engineers continued to identify "weak spots", not all of which could be identified in tests on Earth. In this work, the Ingenuity team has demonstrated the ability to improve beyond what has been achieved. By the end of 2021, it turned out that the already distant deadlines for the possible implementation of improvements are pushed back by at least another 10 years. In the new 10-year concept of space exploration for the period up to 2032, the emphasis is on cheaper or low-cost projects. There are no plans to send Curiosity/Perseverance-class scientific laboratories to Mars, and funding for Martian projects is frozen to the level necessary to complete the Mars sample-return campaign.

However, the idea of Martian helicopters was not shelved, but was further developed. In March 2022, AeroVironment engineers, who previously created Ingenuity, presented the concept of a new helicopter with a payload of 280 g. A 90 g small manipulator arm with a two-fingered gripper and a self-propelled landing gear make it possible to use vehicles of this type instead of a fetch rover to select sample tubes cases with samples collected by Perseverance. At a briefing on September 15, 2022, NASA Planetary Science Division Director Laurie Gleizes confirmed her intention to use two of these helicopters. Thus, the experience of creating Ingenuity will find practical application sooner than might be expected.

Among the challenges posed by extreme conditions on Mars that Ingenuity engineers and programmers worked to overcome, inertial navigation ranked first. Ingenuity needs to show the ability to accurately follow the track it has already "mapped" on previously collected NAV frame sets and land at the takeoff point. In a future sample return mission, each cartridge case would require a pair of flights ending at the point of departure. Landing accuracy was an assigned task of Ingenuity's 31st flight. The very thin atmosphere of Mars does not allow repeating the maneuvers and landing techniques of terrestrial helicopters.

The special selection of a "flat even surface", which was discussed from the first flights, was due not only to the desire to simplify the demonstration. This is predetermined by the very technology of orientation on two-dimensional images of the navigation camera, where the accuracy and the very possibility of obtaining a third dimension rests on the technical limitations of the lidar. On Earth, a mechanical gyroscope helps keep the drone horizontal. On Mars, the role of a gyroscope is performed by inertial sensors, and the physical altitude hold is carried out by changing the parameters of the blades to process the results of regular measurements from these sensors. Garmin lidar height limit (up to 40 m) turned out to be redundant: in practice, the helicopter was not raised above 15 meters. But the restrictions on the type of surface turned out to be insurmountable: due to the abundance of bright spots, it was necessary to abandon the option of flying over the wreckage of the “sky crane”.

The Mastcam stereo pairs film from a 2-meter height, compete with the RTE camera. In addition, at the time of shooting, the coordinates of the NAV / RTE frames are unknown. The use of detailed aerial photography of the 9th flight " E " → " F " when choosing the points of intermediate landings " J ", " K " and " L " when flying along the same route in the opposite direction was not mentioned in the reports on flights 16–19. Meanwhile, it was on this segment that an emergency occurred when, in the last seconds of the 17th flight, communication with the rover was temporarily lost due to the overlap of the line of sight with an unsuccessful location of the antenna of the base radio station of the rover.

The communication range, established empirically on Earth, was blocked by 1.3 times. The restrictions on the volume of traffic via the Zigbee protocol are insurmountable, and they had to be circumvented by splitting the 700 MB post-flight telemetry into several communication sessions. The rover, as an intermediary between the helicopter and the Earth, spent about 6 hours on the initial loading of data and photographic materials. Color photography remains relevant for "cargo" helicopters; in particular, they will have to film the launch of the ship, on which soil samples will be loaded.

Data collected by Ingenuity is intended to support the development of future helicopters capable of carrying larger payloads, Future helicopters could be used to explore special regions with exposed water ice or brines, where Mars microbial life could potentially survive.

The choice of Ingenuity as the prototype for the intended pair of assembler helicopters was based on the impressive safety margin built into it by AeroVironment designers. In principle, even the limit of 100 landings for the high-wear shock absorbers of the chassis is sufficient to transfer all 43 sleeves. Multiple small payloads can be carried by these types of helicopters, deployed and re-deployed to various locations, to perform a variety of distributed and networked operations - leading to new ways of doing science and technology demonstrations on Mars and facilitating eventual human exploration. A group of "helicopter pilots" from the very beginning had reason to keep in mind the possibility of extending flights.

 Gallery 

 Audio 

 Videos 

Deployment sequence

 Maps of flights 

{{multiple images |align=center |direction=horizontal |total_width=800
|header = Flights' paths of the operational demonstration stage and HiRise images of Ingenuity|image5 = 26339 PIA24977 Flight Profile for Ingenuity's Flight 15.jpg
|caption5 = Flight profile for Ingenuitys Flight 15
|image6 = 26396 PIA24980-webTopography an Between Mars Helicopter and Rover for Flight 17.jpg
|caption6 = Topography between Mars helicopter and rover for Flight 17
|image7=Perseverance and Ingenuity wait out the solar conjunction.png
|caption7=Positioning before the 2021 solar conjunctionR210 is the rover position on sol 210;H, H and H means 1st, 2nd and 3rd landing sites of Ingenuity on the Field H on sols 163, 174 and 193 respectively
|image8=PIA25174 Ingenuity captured by Hirise camera on mars reconaissance orbiter.jpg
|caption8=Ingenuity captured by Hirise camera on Mars Reconnaissance Orbiter at Airfield M on February 26, 2022
}}

Images by Perseverance

Images by Ingenuity

Animations

Self-portraits by Perseverance

Miscellaneous Ingenuity-related images

See also 
 
 Atmosphere of Mars – Less than 1% of the Earth's atmosphere pressure and primarily composed of carbon dioxide (95% ), molecular nitrogen (2.8%, N2) and argon (2% Ar)
 
 Dragonfly – Robotic rotorcraft mission to Saturn's moon Titan, planned launch in 2027
 Exploration of Mars
 List of artificial objects on Mars
 List of firsts in aviation
 
 Solar panels on spacecraft
 Vega – The USSR space program that included the first atmospheric balloon flight on Venus, in 1985
 Collier Trophy – Presented to the Ingenuity team in 2022 for "the greatest achievement in aeronautics or astronautics in America during the preceding year"

Notes

References

Citations

Status reports

 
 
 
 
 
 
 
 
 
 
 
 
 
 
 
 
 
 
 
 
 
 
 
 
 
 
 
 
 
 
 
 
 .

External links 

 NASA Mars Helicopter webpage
 NASA Mars Helicopter flight log
 Mars Helicopter Technology Demonstrator. (PDF) – The key design features of the prototype drone.
 
 Perseverance Route Map — including the flight tracks of Ingenuity
 Explore Mars
 AIAA Book Planetary Exploration with Ingenuity and Dragonfly

2020 in the United States
2020 robots
Aircraft with counter-rotating propellers
Coaxial rotor helicopters
Electric helicopters
Extraterrestrial aircraft
Individual space vehicles

Missions to Mars
NASA aircraft
NASA space probes
Space probes launched in 2020
Unmanned helicopters
2021 on Mars
Mars robots